Teodor Atanasov (born June 2, 1996) is a Serbian professional basketball player who currently plays for Akademija FMP in the Macedonian First League. He also holds Macedonian citizenship.

Playing career 
Atanasov played for the Zemun U18 team for the 2013–14 season. In 2014, he joined Vojvodina.

In January 2019, Atanasov joined Aloe Plus Lanzarote Conejeros of the Spanish 4th-tier Liga EBA for the rest of the season.

References

External links
 Atanasov Player Profile at RealGM
 Atanasov Player Profile at eurobasket.com

1996 births
Living people
Centers (basketball)
KK Rabotnički players
KK Vojvodina players
Serbian expatriate basketball people in North Macedonia
Serbian expatriate basketball people in Spain
Serbian men's basketball players
Basketball players from Novi Sad